Webster is an occupational surname of Norman French origin meaning weaver. The name Webster may refer to:

People
Adam Webster (footballer, born 1995) (born 1995), a footballer
Alasdair Webster (born 1934), an Australian politician
Alex Webster, the bass player in the band Cannibal Corpse
Alexander Webster (1708–1784), a Scottish writer and clergyman
Alexander Webster (New York politician) (1734–1810), a New York politician
Andy Webster (footballer, born 1982), a Scottish football player
Arthur Gordon Webster, American physicist, founder of the American Physical Society
Augusta Webster (1837–1894), English poet, dramatist, essayist, and translator
Barbara D. Webster, American botanist
Ben Webster, American jazz musician
Ben Webster (1864-1947), English actor
Benjamin Nottingham Webster (1897-1882), English actor
Bethuel M. Webster (1900–1989), American lawyer and founder of Webster & Sheffield
Beveridge Webster (1908–1999), American pianist
Bruce Webster, American IT expert and software engineer
Bruce Webster (politician) (1927–2019)
Byron Webster, English professional footballer
Charles Webster (disambiguation), several people 
Corey Webster, professional American football player
Daniel Webster (disambiguation), several people
David Webster (disambiguation), several people
Dick Webster (1914–2009), British Army officer and Olympic pole vaulter
Donovan Webster, American journalist
Edwin Hanson Webster (1829–1893), American politician
Elnardo Webster (born 1969), American football player
Faye Webster, American folk singer
Frances Webster (netball), New Zealand netball player
Francis Webster (1767–1827), English architect
Frank Webster (disambiguation), several people 
Gary Webster (disambiguation), several people
Geoff Webster (born 1959), British journalist, and deputy editor of The Sun
George Webster (disambiguation), several people
Graham Webster (archaeologist), British archaeologist
Graham Webster (footballer), Scottish football player
Guy Webster (musician), an Australian singer-songwriter
Guy Webster (photographer) (1939–2019), American photographer
H. T. Webster (Harold Tucker Webster, 1885–1952), American cartoonist
Harry Webster (Henry George Webster), British automotive engineer
Henry Webster (disambiguation), several people
Hutton Webster (1875-1955), American anthropologist, economist and sociologist
J. Webster (Yorkshire cricketer), English cricketer 
Jack Webster (disambiguation), several people
Jacques Berman Webster II (born 1992), better known by his stage name Travis Scott, American recording artist, music producer, and musician 
James Webster (disambiguation), several people
Jean Webster (1876–1916), an American writer
Jean Webster (cook) (1935–2011), an American soup kitchen operator
Jeff Webster (born 1971), an American basketball player
Jeff Webster (checkers player), an American checkers player
J.J. Webster, an American politician
John Webster (disambiguation), several people
John Dodsley Webster, English architect based in Sheffield.
John Ray Webster, American checkers player and military officer
Ken Webster (disambiguation), multiple people
Kenneth Athol Webster (1906–1967), New Zealand ethnographic dealer and collector
Kenneth G. T. Webster (1871–1942), Canadian-born American literary scholar
Kieren Webster (born 1986), bassist and occasional vocalist with Scottish band The View
 Leslie Webster (art historian) (born 1943), a British Anglo-Saxon specialist at the British Museum
 Leslie Webster (Australian politician) (1891–1975), a politician with the Country Party in Victoria
Mark Webster (disambiguation), several people
Malcolm Webster (murderer), Englishman 
Martell Webster, American professional basketball player
Mary Webster (disambiguation), several people
Mike Webster, National Football League player
Milton P. Webster (1887-1965), American trade union functionary
Mitch Webster, Major League Baseball player
Neil Leslie Webster (1906–1990), a British Army officer who worked in intelligence in World War II and radio
Nate Webster, American professional football player
Nesta Helen Webster (1876–1960), an English author and far-right conspiracy theorist who promoted antisemitic canards
Nicholas Webster (1912–2006), a 20th-century American film and television director
Nicole Webster (born 1973), an Australian marine scientist at the Australian Institute of Marine Science
Nikki Webster (born 1987), an Australian singer known for "Strawberry Kisses"
Noah Webster (1758–1843), American lexicographer, creator of Webster's Dictionary
Noel Webster (born 1932), an Australian rules footballer (VFL) who played with Hawthorn 
Norman Webster CM (1941 – 2021), a Canadian journalist and editor-in-chief of The Globe and Mail and The Gazette
Nsimba Webster (born 1996), American football player
Paul Webster (disambiguation), several people
Pearl Webster (1889-1918), Negro league baseball player
Philip Webster, British journalist
Ray Webster (first baseman) (born 1942), an American Major League Baseball player
Ray Webster (second baseman) (1937-2020), an American Major League Baseball player

Renée Webster, Australian filmmaker

Richard Webster (rugby), Welsh international rugby league and union player
Robert Webster (disambiguation), several people
Roger Webster, English professional cornet player
Ron Webster, English football player
Simon Webster (footballer), English  professional footballer
Simon Webster (rugby union), Scottish International Rugby Union player
Thomas Webster (painter), an English painter
Thomas Webster (geologist), a Scottish geologist
Victor Webster, Canadian actor
Wally Webster (1895–1980), English footballer
Walter Ernest Webster, (1877-1959), British painter
Wendy Turner Webster, English presenter
W. D. Webster (William Downing Webster, 1868–1913), British ethnographic dealer and collector
William Webster (disambiguation), several people

Fictional characters

 Nina Webster, a fictional character in The Young and the Restless, an American soap opera
 Webster, a dictionary from Beauty and the Beast: Belle's Magical World
 The Webster family, a group of characters featured in the British soap opera Coronation Street:
Alison Webster (Coronation Street)
Bill Webster
Debbie Webster
Jack Webster (Coronation Street)
Jake Webster (Coronation Street)
Kevin Webster
Maureen Webster
Rosie Webster
Sally Webster
Sophie Webster

See also 
 Webster (disambiguation)
 Webber (disambiguation)
 Weber (disambiguation)

References

English-language surnames
Occupational surnames
English-language occupational surnames

fr:Webster
he:ובסטר
ja:ウェブスター
th:เว็บสเตอร์